Kely Bastien is a Haitian politician. He served as the president of the Chamber of Deputies in 1990s and as president of the Senate of Haiti from  2008 to 2011. A member of president René Préval's LESPWA party, he was trapped in rubble following the 2010 Haiti earthquake, but was found alive and transported to the Dominican Republic for treatment.

References

Presidents of the Senate (Haiti)
Presidents of the Chamber of Deputies (Haiti)
Year of birth missing (living people)
Living people
Lespwa politicians